Ciglence is a settlement in the Municipality of Duplek in northeastern Slovenia. It lies on the southwestern edge of the Slovene Hills, southeast of Maribor. The area is part of the traditional region of Styria. The municipality is now included in the Drava Statistical Region.

The village chapel-shrine with a small belfry dates to the early 20th century. There are two other small roadside chapel-shrines in the settlement. One dates to the first half of the 19th century and the second to the late 19th century.

References

External links
Ciglence at Geopedia

Populated places in the Municipality of Duplek